Daniel Jubani (born 7 December 1993) is an Albanian football player who most recently played for Korabi Peshkopi in the Albanian Superliga.

References

1993 births
Living people
Footballers from Shkodër
Albanian footballers
Association football forwards
KF Vllaznia Shkodër players
KF Laçi players
KF Butrinti players
KS Ada Velipojë players
KF Korabi Peshkopi players
Kategoria Superiore players
Kategoria e Parë players